Emed Akel also spelled Imad Akel (1971–1993) was a commander of the Izz al-Din al-Qassam Brigades, the military wing of Hamas. He was killed at age 22 by Israeli forces outside a house where he was hiding in 1993. In July 2009, Hamas released its first film, a two-hour biopic celebrating the life and martyrdom of Akel. The film was written by Hamas strongman Mahmoud al-Zahar and the interior minister, Fathi Hamad.

Biography
According to his older brother Adel, Emad was more interested in geography than in politics. He was reportedly the most academic student in the class at his elementary school and then assistant to his teacher in preparatory school. Some of his relatives were arrested, including his cousin Walid and other more distant relatives were killed by Israeli troops in firefights. Afterward, he began to support Hamas, joining the movement. On 23 September 1988, Emad and his brother were arrested for their membership with the movement.

After being released, he became a fighter in the Gaza Strip. He became known as "the ghost" for his many disguises, including dressing up as a Jewish settler with a skullcap. In the early 1990s, Akel topped Israel's most wanted list for his suspected role in killing 11 Israeli soldiers, an Israeli civilian and four Palestinian informants in a series of attacks. Emad stated to his brother in 1991, "The Israelis are after me and they will go on following me until I fight back and then I will die at their hands and, for this reason, I will go to paradise."

On 24 November 1993, a Palestinian informant reported to the Israel Defense Forces the location of Akel. Akel was hiding with other fighters in a house in Shuja'iyya. After several hours of the siege of the neighborhood, Akel tried to escape, and was immediately shot by Israel Defense Forces soldiers. At the time of his death, journalist Robert Fisk calls Akel "the most important Hamas activist ever shot dead by the Israeli army." Israeli soldiers buried Akel in a cemetery in the Jabalia Camp at night to avoid demonstrations by Palestinian supporters.

See also
 Ahmad Yasin
 Salah Shehade
 Yahya Ayyash

References

1971 births
1993 deaths
Assassinated Hamas members
Hamas military members
People killed by Israeli security forces